Kunturiri (Aymara kunturi condor, -(i)ri a suffix, Hispanicized spelling Condorire) is a  mountain in the Andes of southern Peru, about  high. It is situated in the Puno Region, Puno Province, Pichacani District. Kunturiri lies northeast of the mountain Wankarani and southeast of Ninachiri.

References

Mountains of Puno Region
Mountains of Peru